Rashi was a medieval French rabbi. It may also refer to:

People
 Kshetrimayum Rashi, Indian actress
 Rashi Bunny, Indian actress
 Rashi Fein, American health economist
 Rashi Mal, Indian actress
 Rashi Rao, Indian model
 Rashi Shapiro, American rabbi and psychologist

Places
 Rashi, Iran, a village in the Gilan Province of Iran

Schools
 Rashi School, Reform Jewish school in Dedham, Mass.

Other uses
 Rashi script, semicursive typeface for the Hebrew alphabet
 Rāśi, a concept in Hindu astrology